Steve Miller Band Live! is a 1983 live album by the Steve Miller Band. Recorded live at the Pine Knob Amphitheater, Clarkston, MI on September 25, 1982.

Track listing
"Gangster of Love" – 2:56
"Rock 'N Me" – 4:08
"Living in the U.S.A." – 3:26
"Fly Like an Eagle" – 3:31
"Jungle Love" – 3:44
"The Joker" – 2:59
"Mercury Blues" – 5:24
"Take the Money and Run" – 3:53
"Abracadabra" – 3:42
"Jet Airliner" – 5:05

Personnel
 Steve Miller – vocals, guitar
 John Massaro – guitar
 Kenny Lee Lewis – guitar
 Norton Buffalo – harmonica
 Byron Allred – keyboards
 Gerald Johnson – bass guitar
 Gary Mallaber – drums, percussion, keyboards

Steve Miller Band albums
1983 live albums
Capitol Records live albums